Jérémy Obin (born 5 March 1993) is a French footballer who plays for and captains Belgian club Sint-Eloois-Winkel. He plays as either a centre-back or left-back.

Career
Born in Lille, Obin began his career playing for hometown club Lille. After failing to establish himself as a professional at Lille, in June 2011, Obin signed a two-year trainee contract with Derby du Nord rivals Valenciennes. He made his professional debut on 31 August 2011 in a 3–2 Coupe de la Ligue defeat away to Dijon appearing as an injury time substitute. Obin is a France youth international having represented his nation at all levels for which he has been eligible. He served as captain at under-17 and under-18 level and represent the former team at the 2010 UEFA European Under-17 Football Championship.

References

External links
 
 
 

Living people
1993 births
French footballers
Footballers from Lille
Association football defenders
Valenciennes FC players
RWS Bruxelles players
K. Patro Eisden Maasmechelen players
Challenger Pro League players
France youth international footballers
Sint-Eloois-Winkel Sport players